

The Pottier P.70 was a single-seat, single-engine sport aircraft developed in France in the 1970s and marketed for homebuilding. It was a mid-wing cantilever monoplane of conventional design with an enclosed cockpit. Originally designed with fixed, tricycle undercarriage, the plans were later revised to offer a fixed, tailwheel option. Construction throughout was of metal. A two-seat, tandem version was developed as the P.170.

Variants
 P.70B - single-seat version with tricycle undercarriage
 P.70S - single-seat version with tailwheel undercarriage
 P.170S - version with two seats in tandem and retractable tricycle undercarriage
Besneux P.70B - The original P.70B built by Alain Besneux.

Specifications (P.70S)

Notes

References

 
 

1970s French sport aircraft
p.070
Homebuilt aircraft
Single-engined tractor aircraft
Mid-wing aircraft